In telecommunication, the term dual access has the following meanings: 

The connection of a user to two switching centers by separate access lines using a single message routing indicator or telephone number.
In satellite communications, the transmission of two carriers simultaneously through a single communication satellite repeater.

Also, network hardware company D-Link has named technology which allows two simultaneous connections over one cable, for example 1) Internet and 2) provider's local FTP or game servers or IPTV data flow.

References

Network access